David McCrae (23 February 1900 – 1976) was a Scottish footballer who played at both professional and international levels as a striker.

After being signed after an impressive Scottish Cup performance as an opposition player with Beith, McCrae played club football for St Mirren, where he was all-time top scorer with 222 league goals and 251 in all competitions and won the Scottish Cup in 1926, scoring in the final. McCrae later played club football for New Brighton, Queen of the South and Darlington.

While at St Mirren, McCrae also earned two caps for Scotland in 1929. His brother was fellow player James McCrae.

See also
List of footballers in Scotland by number of league goals (200+)
List of Scottish football families

Sources

References

1900 births
1976 deaths
Scottish footballers
Association football forwards
Scotland international footballers
Beith F.C. players
St Mirren F.C. players
Queen of the South F.C. players
Scottish Football League players
New Brighton A.F.C. players
Darlington F.C. players
Date of death missing
Footballers from Renfrewshire